The gymnastics competition at the 2006 Commonwealth Games took place from March 16–26 in Rod Laver Arena in Melbourne.

Medal table by country

Artistic gymnastics

Rhythmic gymnastics

Results

Men's artistic gymnastics

Team competition

All-around

Floor exercise

Pommel horse

Still rings

Vault

Parallel bars

High bar

Women's artistic gymnastics

Team competition

All-around

Vault

Uneven bars

Balance beam

Floor exercise

Rhythmic gymnastics

Team competition

All-around

Rope

Ball

Clubs

Ribbon

References

External links
 
 

2006 Commonwealth Games events

2006
Commonwealth Games
International gymnastics competitions hosted by Australia